The following are the basketball events of the year 1970 throughout the world.
Tournaments include international (FIBA), professional (club) and amateur and collegiate levels.

Player awards

American Basketball Association

ABA Most Valuable Player Award
Spencer Haywood (Denver Rockets)

ABA All-Star Game Most Valuable Player
Spencer Haywood (Denver Rockets)

ABA Playoffs Most Valuable Player Award
Roger Brown (Indiana Pacers)

ABA Rookie of the Year Award
Spencer Haywood (Denver Rockets)

National Basketball Association

NBA Most Valuable Player Award
Willis Reed (New York Knicks)

NBA All-Star Game Most Valuable Player
Willis Reed (New York Knicks)

NBA Finals Most Valuable Player Award
Willis Reed (New York Knicks)

NBA Rookie of the Year Award
Lew Alcindor (Milwaukee Bucks)

NAIA
NAIA Basketball Tournament Most Valuable Player
Greg Hyder (Eastern New Mexico)

NCAA
Naismith College Player of the Year
Pete Maravich (LSU)

Helms Foundation College Basketball Player of the Year
Pete Maravich (LSU)
Sidney Wicks (UCLA)

Associated Press College Basketball Player of the Year
Pete Maravich (LSU)

UPI College Basketball Player of the Year
Pete Maravich (LSU)

USBWA College Player of the Year
Pete Maravich (LSU)

Sporting News Men's College Basketball Player of the Year
Pete Maravich (LSU)

Haggerty Award
Charlie Yelverton (Fordham)

Robert V. Geasey Trophy
Ken Durrett (La Salle)

NCAA basketball tournament Most Outstanding Player
Sidney Wicks (UCLA)

Atlantic Coast Conference Men's Basketball Player of the Year
John Roche (South Carolina)

Big Eight Conference Men's Basketball Player of the Year
Dave Robisch (Kansas)

Mid-American Conference Men's Basketball Player of the Year
Ken Kowall (Ohio)

Missouri Valley Conference Men's Basketball Player of the Year
Jim Ard (Cincinnati)

Ohio Valley Conference Men's Basketball Player of the Year
Jim McDaniels (Western Kentucky)

Pacific Coast Athletic Association Men's Basketball Player of the Year
George Trapp (Long Beach State)

Southeastern Conference Men's Basketball Player of the Year
Pete Maravich (LSU)

Southland Conference Men's Basketball Player of the Year
Kenny Haynes (Lamar)

Southern Conference Men's Basketball Player of the Year
Mike Maloy (Davidson)

Southwest Conference Men's Basketball Player of the Year
Gene Phillips (SMU)

West Coast Conference Men's Basketball Player of the Year
Dennis Awtrey (Santa Clara)

NCAA College Division
NCAA College Division basketball tournament Most Outstanding Player
Ted McClain (Tennessee State)

Eastern Professional Basketball League
EPBL Most Valuable Player
Waite Bellamy (Wilmington  Blue Bombers)

ABA
1969-70 ABA season
1970-71 ABA season
1970 ABA All-Star Game
1970 ABA Playoffs

NBA
1970 NBA Draft
1970 NBA Finals
1970 NBA Playoffs
1970 NBA All-Star Game
1969–70 NBA season
1970–71 NBA season

FIBA
1970 FIBA Intercontinental Cup
FIBA Africa Championship 1970
1969–70 FIBA European Champions Cup
1970 FIBA World Championship
1970–71 FIBA European Cup Winners' Cup

NAIA
1970 NAIA Basketball Tournament

NCAA
1970 National Invitation Tournament
1970 NCAA Division II men's basketball tournament
1970 NCAA Division I men's basketball tournament

Women's tournaments
1970 ABC Championship for Women
EuroBasket 1970 Women
1970 ABC Under-18 Championship for Women

International Competition
Basketball at the 1970 Asian Games
Basketball at the 1970 Summer Universiade

Naismith Memorial Basketball Hall of Fame
Class of 1970:
Ben Carnevale
Bob Davies

Deaths
January 2 — Edgar Diddle, American college coach (Western Kentucky) (born 1895)
April 6 — Maurice Stokes, American NBA player (Cincinnati Royals) (born 1933)
April 29 — Forrest DeBernardi, American Hall of Fame player (born 1899)
May 27 — Trajko Rajković, Yugoslav professional and Olympic player (born 1937)
June 4 — Branch McCracken, American Hall of Fame college coach (Indiana Hoosiers) (born 1908)
August 10 — Joe Lapchick, American Hall of Fame player (Original Celtics) and coach (St. John's, New York Knicks) (born 1900)

References

External links 
 Basketball-Reference.com's 1970 NBA Playoffs page
 NBA History